Phumlani Nkosinathi Ntshangase (born 24 December 1994) is a South African soccer player who plays as a midfielder for Baroka.

International career
Ntshangase was called up to the senior South Africa squad for the 2016 COSAFA Cup.

Honours 
Bidvest Wits
Runner-up
 Nedbank Cup: 2013–14

References

1994 births
Living people
South African soccer players
Association football midfielders
Bidvest Wits F.C. players
SuperSport United F.C. players
Maritzburg United F.C. players
Baroka F.C. players
South African Premier Division players
2015 Africa U-23 Cup of Nations players
Footballers at the 2016 Summer Olympics
Olympic soccer players of South Africa
Soccer players from Durban